Douniah Airlines is an airline based at Bamako–Sénou International Airport in Mali. As of April 28, 2014, the airline served seven airports in seven West-African countries. The airline's fleet included an ATR 72.

Destinations
As of May 2014 the airline had seven destinations:

Fleet
As of May 2014 the Douniah Airlines fleet consists of the following aircraft:

References

Airlines established in 2014
Defunct airlines of Mali
2014 establishments in Mali
Companies based in Bamako